The men's 400 metres hurdles at the 2019 World Athletics Championships was held at the Khalifa International Stadium in Doha from 27 to 30 September 2019.

Summary
Coming into these Championships, only four men had ever run under 47 seconds.  While world record holder Kevin Young never officially retired, now at 53 he's largely been a spectator for a couple of decades.  The other three have accomplished the feat in less than a year, two this season in the same race.  And all three were in Doha setting up a highly anticipated confrontation.

It took 48.93 to make the final.  Abdelmalik Lahoulou set the Algerian national record and Alison dos Santos a personal best to get there.

In the final, Rai Benjamin in lane 7 appeared to get a better start, making up the stagger on Lahoulou to his outside, but that may have been deceptive.  Down the backstretch, defending champion Karsten Warholm started to take charge.  All alone in lane 9, the third of the big 3 Abderrahman Samba, was getting passed by.  Through the turn, Warholm held his advantage over Benjamin which revealed to be a full stride coming off the turn.  Kyron McMaster looked to be in third place.  Benjamin made a run at Warholm down the stretch but stretched for the final hurdle, landing awkwardly and losing momentum and his last opportunity to try to catch Warholm.  In front of a home crowd, Samba was able to get past McMaster to take the bronze.

Records
Before the competition records were as follows:

Qualification standard
The standard to qualify automatically for entry was 49.30.

Schedule
The event schedule, in local time (UTC+3), was as follows:

Results

Heats
Qualification: First 4 in each heat (Q) and the next 4 fastest (q) advanced to the semi-finals.

Semi-finals
Qualification: First 2 in each heat (Q) and the next 2 fastest (q) advanced to the Final.

Final
The final was started on 30 September at 22:41.

References

400 hurdles
400 metres hurdles at the World Athletics Championships